Jason Marshall (born June 20, 1978) is a former professional tennis player from the United States.

Biography
Born in Dallas, Marshall attended J.J. Pearce High School in Richardson, Texas. After an injury plagued high school tennis career, he was recruited by Indiana's Purdue University, where he was a two-time Big Ten singles champion.

From 2001 he competed as a professional, most successfully in the doubles format. A left-handed player, Marshall reached a best doubles ranking of 101 in the world and featured in the main draw of five ATP Tour tournaments from 2003 to 2005. He twice competed in Wimbledon qualifying for the men's doubles and won a total of five ATP Challenger titles in doubles. As a singles player, he had a win over Marcos Baghdatis in the qualifying draw of the 2005 Ho Chi Minh City Open and won an ITF tournament in Tijuana the same year.

Marshall was the head coach of women's tennis at Georgia State University between 2014 and 2018.

Challenger titles

Doubles: (5)

References

External links
 
 

1978 births
Living people
American male tennis players
Tennis players from Dallas
Purdue Boilermakers men's tennis players
Georgia State Panthers women's tennis coaches
American tennis coaches